Macovişte may refer to several places in Romania:

 Macovişte, a village in Ciuchici Commune, Caraş-Severin County
 Macovişte, a village in Cornea Commune, Caraş-Severin County

See also 
 Macovei (surname)